FICCI Frames is an international convention of the Media & Entertainment (M&E) industry, formerly chaired by Yash Chopra and co-chaired by Karan Johar. It is organized annually by the Federation of Indian Chambers of Commerce & Industry (FICCI).

FICCI FRAMES is Asia's largest and most influential annual media & entertainment convention and is one of the most definitive platforms for Media & Entertainment Industry over the last 22 years to brainstorm on the issues related to the sector, ideate solutions, share global best practices, showcase cutting-edge technologies, and putting up a Global Trade show of M&E businesses.

FRAMES not only facilitate communication and exchange between key industry figures, influencers and policy makers, it is also an unparalleled platform for the exchange of ideas and knowledge between individuals, countries and conglomerates. FRAMES has brought together more the 400,000 professionals from India and abroad representing the various sectors of the industry.

Programs
Activities at FICCI Frames include conference sessions, keynote addresses, masterclasses and workshops, policy roundtables, B2B meetings, exhibitions, cultural evenings, networking events, and the BAF Awards.

FICCI Frames' Initiatives

1. Frame Your Idea- Pitching Sessions
A platform for those with a creative spark and the burning desire to achieve success in celluloid but having no access to makers, Frame Your Idea provides budding scriptwriters and content creators a chance to pitch their ideas and creations to big Production houses. 10 Projects Greenlit: Over 10 Scripts have been successfully commercialized into big Projects.

2. Best Animated Frames (BAF) Awards
BAF felicitates the best of the minds from across the world in the field of Animation by recognizing their contribution and awarding them at the platform of FRAMES. Every year 400+ applications are received across 10 categories from 12+ countries.

3. Frames' Content Market 
India’s first market for Media & Entertainment content and services that connects buyers from across the world to the Indian Content Creators/ Sellers. Buyers from 35+ Countries have participated at FRAMES’ content market confluence since 2018 leading to many business dealings.

FICCI Frames Excellence Awards

Categories:

History

See also
List of anime conventions
List of gaming conventions
List of comic book conventions
List of multigenre conventions

External links

References

Conventions (meetings)
Indian film awards
Film industry in India
Annual events in India
1999 establishments in Maharashtra